The Hanseatic Days of New Time or the Hansa Days of New Time is an annual international festival of member cities of the Hanseatic League of New Time (also known as the New Hansa).

The Hanseatic Days are held annually in one of the member cities of the New Hansa since 1980, when it was decided to re-establish the Hanseatic League and the first Hanseatic Days were held in Zwolle, the Netherlands. During the festival, Hanseatic cities from different European countries try to position themselves as cities that have rich historic traditions but that continue their successful development in our days as well. Apart from the festival, Hanseatic Days include an international forum where representatives of member cities of the New Hansa discuss their political, economic and cultural cooperation.

Venues

 1980 – Zwolle, Netherlands
 1982 – Dortmund, Germany
 1983 – Lübeck, Germany
 1984 – Neuss, Germany
 1985 – Braunschweig, Germany
 1986 – Duisburg, Germany
 1987 – Kalmar, Sweden
 1988 – Cologne, Germany
 1989 – Hamburg, Germany
 1990 – Deventer and Zutphen, Netherlands
 1991 – Wesel, Germany
 1992 – Tallinn, Estonia
 1993 – Münster, Germany
 1994 – Stade, Germany
 1995 – Soest, Germany
 1996 – Bergen, Norway
 1997 – Gdańsk, Poland
 1998 – Visby, Sweden
 1999 – Oldenzaal, Netherlands
 2000 – Zwolle, Netherlands
 2001 – Riga, Latvia
 2002 – Bruges, Belgium
 2003 – Frankfurt (Oder), Germany and Słubice, Poland
 2004 – Turku, Finland
 2005 – Tartu, Estonia
 2006 – Osnabrück, Germany
 2007 – Lippstadt, Germany
 2008 – Salzwedel, Germany
 2009 – Novgorod, Russia
 2010 – Pärnu, Estonia
 2011 – Kaunas, Lithuania
 2012 – Lüneburg, Germany
 2013 – Herford, Germany
 2014 –  Lübeck, Germany
 2015 – Viljandi, Estonia
 2016 – Bergen, Norway
 2017 – Kampen, Netherlands
 2018 – Rostock, Germany
 2019 – Pskov, Russia
 2020 – Brilon, Germany
 2021 – Riga, Latvia
 2022 – Neuss, Germany
 2023 – Toruń, Poland
 2024 – Gdańsk, Poland
 2025 – Visby, Sweden
 2026 – Stargard Szczeciński, Poland
 2027 – Braunschweig, Germany
 2028 – Stralsund, Germany
 2029 – Wismar, Germany
 2030 – Zwolle, Netherlands

See also
 Tartu Hanseatic Days

External links

 Website of the New Hansa
 29th International Hanseatic Days in Novgorod, Russia
 30th International Hansa Days 2010 in Pärnu, Estonia

Hanseatic League
European culture